Dangyang is a city in western Hubei province, People's Republic of China, lying  east of the Gezhouba Dam on the Yangtze River. During the Western Han Dynasty (206-24 BC). In 1988 the State Council of the People's Republic of China elevated this from a county to a county-level city, and is currently under the administration of the prefecture-level city of Yichang.

Dangyang used to be a strategic point in ancient wars. Sun Bin and Pang Juan, two famous strategists of the Warring States period (475-221 BC) studied military affairs from Gui Guzi at Daxian Cave in Dangyang. The Green Woods Uprising was launched in Dangyang and several battles were fought in Dangyang during the Three Kingdoms Period (AD 220-280).

Today Dangyang is a rapidly growing modern city with a population of over 100,000. While agriculture remains a key industry in Dangyang, industrial production now includes output in the areas of foodstuffs, building materials, textiles, chemicals, electronics, machinery, energy and packaging.

On August 11, 2016, an explosion at a chemical factory in Dangyang killed 21 people and injured at least 5.

Administrative divisions

Three subdistricts:
Yuyang Subdistrict, Baling Subdistrict, Yuquan Subdistrict

Seven towns:
Lianghe, Herong, Yuxi (/), Miaoqian, Wangdian, Banyue, Caobuhu

Climate

References

External links

 
Cities in Hubei
Geography of Yichang
County-level divisions of Hubei